Mesquita Futebol Clube, usually known simply as Mesquita, is a Brazilian football team from the city of Mesquita, Rio de Janeiro state, founded on May 9, 1920.

Titles
Campeonato Carioca Terceira Divisão: 1981

Stadium
The home stadium Nielsen Lousada, nicknamed Lousadão, has a capacity of 4,000 people.

Colors
The official colors are black and white.

External links
Mesquita Futebol Clube af FFERJ

 
Association football clubs established in 1920
Football clubs in Rio de Janeiro (state)
1920 establishments in Brazil